Henan Elephants may refer to the following Chinese professional sports teams based in Henan province:

Henan Roaring Elephants, a men's basketball team in the National Basketball League (NBL)
Henan Phoenix, a women's basketball team in the Women's Chinese Basketball Association (WCBA), formerly known as Henan Elephants 
Henan Elephants (baseball), a baseball team in the now defunct China Baseball League (CBL)

See also
Henan Television, nicknamed the Elephant Channel (大象台) in China
Elephants in ancient China, which mentions the history of elephants in Henan